Music sequencers are hardware devices or application software that can record, edit, or play back music, by handling note and performance information.

Hardware sequencers 

Many synthesizers, and by definition all music workstations, groove machines and drum machines, contain their own sequencers.

The following are specifically designed to function primarily as the music sequencers:

Rotating object with pins or holes 

 Barrel or cylinder with pins (since 9th or 14th century) — utilized on barrel organs, carillons, music boxes
 Metal disc with punched holes (late 18th century) — utilized on several music boxes such as Polyphon, Regina, Symphonion, Ariston, Graphonola (early version), etc.

Punched paper 

 Book music (since 1890) for pneumatics system  — utilized on several mechanical organs
 Music roll for pneumatics system — utilized on player pianos (using piano rolls), Orchestrions, several mechanical organs, etc.
 Punch tape system for earliest studio synthesizers
 RCA Mark II Sound Synthesizer by Herbert Belar and Harry Olson at RCA, a room-filling device built in 1957 for half a million dollars.  Included a 4-polyphony synth with 12 oscillators, a sequencer fed with wide paper tape, with output recorded by a disc cutting lathe.
 Siemens Synthesizer (1959) at Siemens-Studio für elektronische Musik

Sound-on-film 

	

 Variophone (1930) by Evgeny Sholpo—on earliest version, hand drawn waves on film or disc were used to synthesize sound, and later versions were promised to experiment on musical intonations and temporal characteristics of live music performance, however not finished. Variophone is often referred as a forerunner of drawn sound system including ANS synthesizer and Oramics.
 Composer-Tron (1953) by Osmond Kendal—rhythmical sequences were controlled via marking cue on film, while timbre of note or envelope-shape of sound were defined via hand drawn shapes on a surface of a  CRT input device, drawn with a grease pencil.
 ANS synthesizer (1938-1958) by Evgeny Murzin—an earliest realtime additive synthesizer using 720 microtonal sine waves (1/6 semitones × 10 octaves) generated by five glass discs. Composers could control the time evolution of amplitudes of each microtone via scratches on a glass plate user interface covered with black mastic.
 Oramics (1957) by Daphne Oram—hand drawn contours on a set of ten sprocketed synchronized strips of 35 film were used to control various parameters of monophonic sound generator (frequency, timbre, amplitude and duration).  Polyphonic sounds were obtained using multitrack recording technique.

Electro-mechanical sequencers 

	

 Wall of Sound (mid-1940s–1950s) by Raymond Scott—early electro-mechanical sequencer developed by Raymond Scott to produce rhythmic patterns, consistent with stepping relays, solenoids, and tone generators
 Circle Machine (1959) by Raymond Scott—electro-optical rotary sequencer developed by Raymond Scott to generate arbitrary waveforms, consistent with dimmer bulbs arranged in a ring, and a rotating arm with photocell scanning over the ring
 Wurlitzer Sideman (1959)—first commercial drum machine; rhythm patterns were electro-mechanically generated by rotating disk switches, and drum sounds were electronically generated by vacuum-tube circuits

Analog sequencers

Analog sequencers with CV/Gate interface 

 Buchla 100's sequencer modules (1964/1966–)
	One of the earliest analog sequencers of the modular synthesizer era since 1960. Later, Robert Moog admired Buchla's unique works including it
 Moog 960 Sequential Controller / 961 Interface / 962 Sequential Switch (c.1968)
	A popular analog sequencer module for the Moog modular synthesizer system, following the earliest Buchla sequencer
 Aries AR334 (module)
 ARP 1601 and 1027 (module)
 Buchla 245, 246
 Doepfer Dark Time
 Electro Harmonix Sequencer
 EML  400
 ETI 603 (DIY project)
 genoQs Octopus-digital midi
 genoQs Nemo-digital midi
 Korg SQ-10
 MFB Urzwerg / MFB Urzwerg Pro—CV/Gate step sequencer with 8steps/4tracks or 16steps/2tracks; also synchronizable with MIDI sequencer
 Oberheim Mini Sequencer MS1A
 PAiA  4780
 Polyfusion AS1, AS1R and 2040/2041/2042/2043 modules
 PPG 313, 314
 Roland 104, 182, 717A
 Sequential Circuits Model 600
 Serge Modular TKB, SQP, SEQ8
 Steiner Parker 151
 Synthesizers.com Q119
 Synthesizers.com Q960—reissue of Moog 960 
 WMS 1020A
 Yamaha CS30 (1977)—monophonic synthesizer keyboard with built-in 8-step analog sequencer

Analog-style step sequencers

Analog-style MIDI step sequencers 

Since the analog synthesizer revivals in the 1990s, newly designed MIDI sequencers with a series of knobs or sliders similar to analog sequencer have appeared. These often equip CV/Gate and DIN sync interface along with MIDI, and even patch memory for multiple sequence patterns and possibly song sequences. These analog-digital hybrid machines are often called "Analogue-style MIDI step sequencer" or "MIDI analogue sequencer", etc.
	

 Doepfer MAQ 16/3—MIDI analog sequencer, designed in cooperation with Kraftwerk
 Doepfer Regelwerk—MIDI analog sequencer with MIDI controller
 Frostwave Fat Controller
 Infection Music Phaedra
 Infection Music Zeit
 Latronic Notron
 Manikin Schrittmacher
 Quasimidi Polymorph (1999)—Four-part multitimbral tabletop synthesizer, with an analogue-like step sequencer
 Roland EF-303—Multiple effects unit with 16-step modulation, also usable as the analog-style MIDI step sequencer
 Sequentix P3

Analog-style MIDI pattern sequencers 

Several machines also provide "song mode" to play the sequence of memorised patterns in specified order, as per drum machines.

 Doepfer Schaltwerk—MIDI pattern sequencer

Step sequencers (supported on) 

Typical step sequencers are integrated on drum machines, bass machines, groove machines, music production machines, and these software versions. Often, these also support the semi-realtime recording mode, too.

 MFB Step 64—Standalone step sequencer dedicated for drum patterns (16 steps/4 tracks or 64 steps/1 track, 118 programs×4 banks, 16 song sequences, each with up to 128 sequences)

Embedded self-contained step sequencers 

	

Several tiny keyboards provide a step sequencer combined with an independent timing mode for recording and performance:

 Casio VL-Tone VL-1 (1979), Casiotone MT-70 (c.1984), Sampletone SK-1 (1986), etc.—Timings of musical notes stored on the step sequencer, can be designated by the two trigger buttons labeled "One Key Play", around the right hand position

Embedded CV/Gate step sequencers 

Several machines have white and black chromatic keypads, to enter the musical phrases.

 Multivox / Firstman SQ-01 (1980)—a forerunner of TB-303
 Roland TB-303 (1981)
 Roland SH-101 (1982)—monophonic keytar synthesizer with sequencer
 Roland MC-202 (1983)—monophonic tabletop synthesizer with sequencer, similar to SH-101

Embedded MIDI step sequencers 

Groovebox-type machines with white and black chromatic keypads, often support step recording mode along with realtime recording mode:

 Korg Electribe / Electribe 2 series
 Roland Corporation MC series: MC-09 / MC-303 / MC-307 / MC-505 / MC-808 / MC-909
 Yamaha RM1x
 Yamaha RS7000—Music Production Studio

Other groovebox-type machines (including several music production machines) also often support step recording mode, of course:

 Linn 9000 (1984)
 Sequential Circuits Studio 440 (1986)
 E-mu SP-12 (1986)
 E-mu SP-1200 (1987)
 Akai MPC series (1988–)
 Akai MPC Renaissance / Studio / Fly (2012)—Software with control surfaces
 Native Instruments Maschine (2009)—Software with control surface
 Roland MV-30
 Roland MV-8000—Production Studio

Button-grid-style step sequencers 

Recently emerging button-grid-style interfaces/instruments are naturally support step sequence. On these machines, one axis on grid means musical scale or sample to play, and another axis means timing of notes.
	

 Akai APC40—interface for Ableton Live
 Arduinome—interface
 Bliptronics 5000—instrument
 Monome—interface
 Novation Launchpad—interface for Ableton Live
 Yamaha Tenori-on—instrument
 Synthstrom Deluge - Piano-roll-style sequencing on 128 pads (16×8)

In addition, newly designed hardware MIDI sequencers equipping a series of knobs/sliders similar to analog sequencers, are appeared. For details, see #Analog-style MIDI step sequencers.

Digital sequencers

CV/Gate 

Also often support Gate clock and DIN sync interfaces.

 EDP Spider (late 1970s)—supported LINK and CV/Gate
 EMS Sequencer series (1971)
 Max Mathews GROOVE system (1970)
 Multivox MX-8100 / Firstman SQ-10 (1979/1980)—supported V/Oct. and Hz/V 
 Oberheim DS-2 (1974)
 Roland CSQ-100
 Roland CSQ-600 (1980)—it memories 600 notes for individual 4 tracks, a buddy of TR-808
 Roland MC-4 Microcomposer (1981)
 Roland MC-8 Microcomposer (1977)—also supporting DCB via OP-8
 Sequential Circuits Model 800 (1977)

Proprietary digital interfaces (pre MIDI era) 

 NED Synclavier series—CV/Gate interface and MIDI retrofit kit were available on Synclavier II.  Also MIDI became standard feature on Synclavier PSMT
 Fairlight CMI series—CV/Gate interface was optionally available on Series II, and MIDI was supported on Series IIx and later models
 Oberheim DSX (Oberheim Parallel Bus)
 PPG Wave family (PPG Bus)
 Rhodes Chroma (Chroma Computer Interface)
 Roland JSQ-60 (Roland Digital Control Bus (DCB))
 Sequential Circuits PolySequencer 1005 (SCI Serial Bus)
 Yamaha CS70M (Key Code Interface)

Hardware MIDI sequencers

Standalone MIDI sequencers 

 Akai ASQ10
 Alesis MMT-8—a buddy of HR-16 drum machine
 Korg SQD-1
 Korg SQD-8
 Kawai Q-80
 Roland MC-327
 Roland MC series: MC-50/MC-50MkII/MC-80/MC-300/MC-500 Microcomposer
 Roland MSQ-100 (1985)
 Roland MSQ-700 (1984)—one of the earliest multitrack MIDI sequencer (8tr), a buddy of TR-909
 Roland SB-55—SMF recorder
 Yamaha QX series: QX1/QX3/QX5/QX7/QX21

MIDI phrase sequencers 

 Zyklus MPS

Embedded MIDI sequencers 

 Sequential Circuits Six-Track (1984), MultiTrak (1985), Split-8 / Pro-8 (1985)

MIDI sequencers with embedded sound module 

 Yamaha TQ5—desktop version of EOS YS200 FM workstation

 Yamaha QY10—with embedded GM tone generator (1990)
 Yamaha QY20—with embedded GM tone generator (1992)
 Yamaha QY300—with embedded GM tone generator (1994)
 Yamaha QY20—with embedded GM tone generator (1995)
 Yamaha QY700—with embedded XG tone generator (1996)
 Yamaha QY70—with embedded XG tone generator (1997)
 Yamaha QY100—with embedded XG tone generator (2000)

Palmtop MIDI sequencers  

	

 Korg SQ-8—palmtop sequencer
 Philips Micro Composer PMC100
 Roland PMA-5—palmtop sequencer with touch screen
 Yamaha Walkstation series: QY8/QY10/QY20/QY22/QY70/QY100—palmtop sequencer with embedded sound module

Accompaniment machines 

	

 Boss DR-5 Dr.Rhythm Section
 Yamaha QR10 Musical Accompaniment Player

Open-source hardware 

 MIDIbox Sequencer modules—Analog-style MIDI step sequencer/MIDI effect processor modules of MIDIbox project
 oTTo Sampler, Sequencer, Multi-engine synth and effects - in a box.

Software sequencers and DAWs with sequencing features

Free, open source

Scorewriters 

 MuseScore—Linux, Windows, OS X

DAW with MIDI sequencers 

 Ardour—Linux, OS X, FreeBSD, Windows
 LMMS—Linux, Windows
 MusE—Linux
 Qtractor—Linux
 Rosegarden—Linux
 Auxy: Beat Studio—iOS 7

Drum machines 

Excluding Mozilla Firefox)

 Hydrogen—Linux, OS X

Commercial

Scorewriters 

 Aegis Sonix—Amiga

Software MIDI sequencers 

 B-Step Sequencer from Monoplugs
 Fugue Machine from Alexandernaut
 Master Tracks Pro from Passport Music Software

Loop-oriented DAWs with MIDI sequencers 

 ACID Pro and Cinescore from Sony Creative Software
 Live from Ableton
 GarageBand from Apple
 REAPER from Cockos
 Tracktion from Mackie

Tracker-oriented DAWs with MIDI sequencers 

 Renoise

DAWs with MIDI sequencers 

 Ableton Live from Ableton
 Audition from Adobe (removed since Version 4 CS5.5)
 Bitwig Studio from Bitwig
 Cubase and Nuendo from Steinberg
 Digital Performer from MOTU
 REAPER from Cockos
 FL Studio from Image Line Software
 Logic Pro and Logic Express from Apple
 Mixcraft from Acoustica
 Mixbus from Harrison
 MuLab from MUTools
 MultitrackStudio from Bremmers Audio Design
 n-Track Studio from n-Track Software
 Pro Tools from Avid
 Samplitude, Sequoia, Music Maker and Music Studio from Magix
 Sonar, Music Creator and Home Studio from Cakewalk
Studio One from PreSonus
 Podium from Zynewave (gratis)
 Z-Maestro from Z-Systems

Integrated software studio environments 

 Reason and Record from Propellerhead
 Storm from Arturia

See also 
List of music software

References 

Music sequencers